Wolfgang Rausch (born 30 April 1947) is a German former professional footballer who played as a defender. He made a total of 257 appearances in the Bundesliga during his playing career.

Career
Rausch was born in Aachen. In 1979, he left Germany for the United States where he signed with the Dallas Tornado of the North American Soccer League.  Rausch played three outdoor and one indoor seasons with the Tornado.  While with the Tornado, he also played the 1979–1980 Major Indoor Soccer League season on loan with the Detroit Lightning.  In the fall of 1981, Rausch left the Tornado and signed with the New Jersey Rockets of the MISL.  In 1982, he moved back outdoors with the Oklahoma City Slickers of the second division American Soccer League at the request of head coach Brian Harvey, an ex-teammate from the Tornado. During his season in Oklahoma, Rausch was also an assistant coach.  After one season, he joined the newly established Dallas Americans as a player-coach.  The ASL collapsed after the 1983 season and the Americans moved to the United Soccer League for the 1984 and 1985 seasons.

References

External links 
 
 American stats

1947 births
Living people
Sportspeople from Aachen
German footballers
Footballers from North Rhine-Westphalia
Association football defenders
Germany under-21 international footballers
American Soccer League (1933–1983) coaches
American Soccer League (1933–1983) players
Bundesliga players
2. Bundesliga players
Major Indoor Soccer League (1978–1992) players
North American Soccer League (1968–1984) indoor players
North American Soccer League (1968–1984) players
United Soccer League (1984–85) coaches
United Soccer League (1984–85) players
1. FC Köln players
Rot-Weiss Essen players
Kickers Offenbach players
FC Bayern Munich footballers
Dallas Tornado players
Detroit Lightning players
New Jersey Rockets (MISL) players
Dallas Americans players
German football managers
German expatriate footballers
German expatriate sportspeople in the United States
Expatriate soccer players in the United States